The 2015 Sint Maarten Soccer Association (SMSA) Senior League was the 40th season of top division football in Sint Maarten. The title was won by Flames United.

References

External links
SMSA Homepage via CONCACAF

SMSA Senior League seasons
Sint Maarten
football